is a railway station in the city of  Nagaoka, Niigata, Japan, operated by East Japan Railway Company (JR East).

Lines
Maekawa Station is served by the Shin'etsu Main Line and is 67.4 kilometers from the terminus of the line at Naoetsu Station.

Station layout
The station consists of two  ground-level opposed side platforms connected by an underground passage. The station is unattended.

Platforms

History
Maekawa Station opened on 15 August 1964.  With the privatization of Japanese National Railways (JNR) on 1 April 1987, the station came under the control of JR East.

Surrounding area
Niigata Prefectural Driver's License Centre, Nagaoka branch

See also
 List of railway stations in Japan

External links

 JR East station information 

Railway stations in Nagaoka, Niigata
Railway stations in Japan opened in 1964
Shin'etsu Main Line
Stations of East Japan Railway Company